Twist of Faith is a 2013 American romantic drama television film directed by Paul A. Kaufman. The film centers on Nina (Toni Braxton), a single mother living in Brent, Alabama, who helps Jacob Fisher (David Julian Hirsh), an Orthodox Jewish man originally residing in Brooklyn whose wife and three children were murdered. Nina is assisted by her gospel community who helps Jacob make sense of his loss. The film premiered on Lifetime on February 9, 2013. Braxton's son who was diagnosed with autism played a minor role in the film.

Cast
 Toni Braxton as Nina Jones
 David Julian Hirsh as Jacob Fisher
 Nathaniel James Potvin as Asher Jones
 Paula Shaw as Hava Fisher
 Kyra Zagorsky as Ruth Fisher
 Mykelti Williamson as Uncle Moe

References

2013 television films
2013 films
2013 romantic drama films
American romantic drama films
American drama television films
Films about Orthodox and Hasidic Jews
Films set in Alabama
Films shot in British Columbia
Lifetime (TV network) films
Romance television films
Films directed by Paul A. Kaufman
2010s American films